WRQY (96.5 FM) is a broadcast radio station licensed to Moundsville, West Virginia, serving Wheeling in West Virginia and St. Clairsville in Ohio. WRQY is owned and operated by Cody Barack through licensee Ohio Midland Newsgroup.

History

On December 20, 2011, the then-WBGI-FM dropped the "K-Love" contemporary Christian format and began stunting. On December 27, 2011, WBGI-FM flipped to country, branded as "Biggie 96.5".

On September 10, 2012, WBGI-FM's country format moved to 100.5 FM in Bellaire, Ohio, swapping formats with "Jack FM" WYJK-FM, which moved to the 96.5 FM frequency. On September 18, 2012, the stations swapped call signs, with WBGI-FM changing to WYJK-FM and vice versa.

On September 8, 2014, WYJK-FM flipped to a hybrid sports/active rock format, branded as "Rocky 96.5"; the station also changed call letters to WRQY.

On March 26, 2018, WRQY flipped to classic rock, still under the "Rocky 96.5" branding. The station's format is fed via Westwood One's "Classic Rock X" network, which was developed in consultation with Forever Media and debuted on WRQY.

On November 12, 2021, WRQY's Facebook page posted a picture of their logo with the "classic" word crossed out with the text "Monday at 3", possibly teasing a reversal of the format on that day and time, which would be on November 15. At that time, WRQY shifted back to active rock, branded as "Rage 96.5." The final song played before the switch was "Mysterious Ways" by U2.

References

External links

RQY
Active rock radio stations in the United States